Nederland’s Adelsboek, informally known as Het Rode Boekje (the red book), is a book series published annually since 1903, containing the genealogies of Dutch noble families. It is issued by the Centraal Bureau voor Genealogie in The Hague.

See also 
 List of Dutch noble families

External links 
 List of noble family names 
 List of Dutch noble family names, 1814-present

Genealogy publications
Biographical dictionaries